Radik Vodopyanov (born 20 August 1984) is a former Kyrgystani footballer, having represented the national team from 2004 to 2007.

References

1984 births
Living people
Kyrgyzstani footballers
Kyrgyzstan international footballers
Footballers at the 2006 Asian Games
FC Dordoi Bishkek players
FC Alga Bishkek players
Association football central defenders
Sportspeople from Bishkek
Asian Games competitors for Kyrgyzstan